The 1903–04 season was the 16th season of The Football League.

Final league tables

The tables below are reproduced here in the exact form that they can be found at The Rec.Sport.Soccer Statistics Foundation website and in Rothmans Book of Football League Records 1888–89 to 1978–79, with home and away statistics separated.

Beginning with the season 1894–95, clubs finishing level on points were separated according to goal average (goals scored divided by goals conceded), or more properly put, goal ratio. In case one or more teams had the same goal difference, this system favoured those teams who had scored fewer goals. The goal average system was eventually scrapped beginning with the 1976–77 season.

During the first five seasons of the league, that is until the season, 1893–94, re-election process concerned the clubs which finished in the bottom four of the league. From the 1894–95 season and until the 1920–21 season the re-election process was required of the clubs which finished in the bottom three of the league.

First Division

Results

Maps

Second Division

Results

Maps

See also
1903-04 in English football
1903 in association football
1904 in association football

References

Ian Laschke: Rothmans Book of Football League Records 1888–89 to 1978–79. Macdonald and Jane’s, London & Sydney, 1980.

English Football League seasons
1903–04 in English association football leagues